Events from the year 2003 in Taiwan, Republic of China. This year is numbered Minguo 92 according to the official Republic of China calendar.

Incumbents
 President – Chen Shui-bian
 Vice President – Annette Lu
 Premier – Yu Shyi-kun
 Vice Premier – Lin Hsin-i

Events

January
 14 January – The establishment of InnoLux Corporation.

February
 14 February – The opening of Tamsui Lover's Bridge in Tamsui Township, Taipei County.

March
 10 March – The opening of European Economic and Trade Office in Taipei.

May
 2 May – Apple Daily, Taiwan's tabloid-style newspaper, was first published.

June
 12–24 June – Typhoon Soudelor hit Taiwan. The storm caused about $2.46 million in damage.
 17 June – The establishment of Taiwan Foundation for Democracy.

July
 1 July – The establishment of Hakka TV.
 28 July – The groundbreaking ceremony of Central Taiwan Science Park.

September
 17 September – The establishment of Taiwan Accreditation Foundation.

October
 17 October – The opening of National Museum of Taiwan Literature in West Central District, Tainan.
 27 October – The establishment of Cathay United Bank after the merging of United World Chinese Commercial Bank and Cathay Commercial Bank.

November
 1 November – The first Taiwan Pride was held.

December
 11 December – 2004 Democratic Progressive Party presidential primary.

See also
List of Chinese films of 2003
List of Taiwanese dramas from 2000 to 2010
2003 timeline in Taiwan Futures Exchange
TVBS is renamed in 2003

Events with dates not present in the "Events" section
In 2003, Taiwan proposed a bill to legalize same-sex marriage.
The Rose (TV series) was released in 2003.
Education in Taiwan's National education budget was NT$ 608.6 billion in 2003.

References

External links
Year 2003 Calendar - Taiwan
Taiwan, 2003 Timeline

 
Years of the 21st century in Taiwan
Taiwan
2000s in Taiwan
Taiwan